The 2020-21 Northern Arizona Lumberjacks men's basketball team represented Northern Arizona University in the 2020-21 NCAA Division I men's basketball season. The Lumberjacks were led by second year head coach Shane Burcar, and played their home games at the Rolle Activity Center as members of the Big Sky Conference. They finished the season 6-16, 4-10 in Big Sky Play to finish in 10th place. They defeated Portland State in the first round before losing in the quarterfinals to Eastern Washington.

Previous season
The Lumberjacks finished the 2019-20 season 16–14 overall, 10–10 in Big Sky play to finish in a tie for 5th place - both improvements from the previous season. In the Big Sky Conference tournament, they lost to Idaho State in the first round.

Roster

Schedule and results

|-
!colspan=12 style=| Regular season

|-
!colspan=12 style=| Big Sky tournament
|-

|-

Source

References

Northern Arizona Lumberjacks men's basketball seasons
Northern Arizona Lumberjacks
Northern Arizona Lumberjacks men's basketball
Northern Arizona Lumberjacks men's basketball